Anand Lal Shimpi (born June 26, 1982) is a former tech journalist and American businessman who retired at the age of 32 from the publishing industry to join the hardware division at Apple Inc. He is primarily known as the founder of the technology website AnandTech, a hardware news/review site which started as motherboard reviews hosted on GeoCities. At that time Anand was just 14 years old and over a period of 17 years it grew to be one of the most respected sites for tech reviews. He also wrote a book in 2001, named " The Anandtech Guide to PC Gaming Hardware".

Early life 
Anand was born to Lalchand Shimpi, an Indian-born computer science professor at St Augustine's University, and Razieh Shimpi, an Iranian-born teacher in Raleigh, NC. When Shimpi was in third grade, his father enrolled him in a computer course. He built his first PC in sixth grade and soon began building PCs for others. He is a graduate of William G. Enloe GT/IB Center for the Humanities, Sciences, and the Arts and North Carolina State University with a degree in Computer Engineering with emphasis on microprocessor architecture and design.

Career 
He started AnandTech in 1997 at the age of 15. He called it Anand's Hardware Tech Page. He first started reviewing motherboards; later he would go on to review CPUs, hard drives, RAM, and other computer components. His tech reviews were in-depth and thorough, making it the preferred site for hardware engineers and enthusiasts, receiving praise from spokespersons from AMD and Intel. He served as its editor-in-chief from 1997 to 2014. AnandTech grew from a small GeoCities website in 1997 to a 50 million page view per month publication . AnandTech started as a site that mainly reviewed motherboards and soon added CPUs, video cards, cases, notebooks, Macs, smartphones, tablets and other hardwares. He reportedly was able to get his hands on an AMD K6-III before any other reviewers.

Anand has been featured in USA Today, 20/20, 48 Hours, G4 and on Fortune Magazine. He has been one of the celebrity speakers at Computex 2003 in Taiwan.

In 2013 he was named as an expert in the BBC's coverage of the Xbox One and PlayStation 4.

On August 30, 2014, he announced his decision to retire from the technology publishing industry to work at Apple's hardware technologies division, and named longtime AnandTech editor Ryan Smith as his successor.

On February 15, 2020, Bloomberg reported that Anand sent confidential documents to Gerard Williams III after the latter had left Apple to form NUVIA.

Publications 
Anand is also the author of the book The AnandTech Guide to PC Gaming Hardware and has a regular column in Computer Power user (CPU) Magazine called Anand's Corner.

References

External References 

 The Road Ahead by Anand Lal Shimpi

1982 births
Living people
American technology writers
Writers from Raleigh, North Carolina
American people of Indian descent
Businesspeople from Raleigh, North Carolina
American chief executives
American male journalists
American writers of Indian descent
American writers of Iranian descent
William G. Enloe High School alumni
Apple Inc. people